William Neil Eschmeyer, also known as Bill Eschmeyer, is an American ichthyologist. He is the founder and developer of the database and reference work Catalog of Fishes, hosted by the California Academy of Sciences and available both on-line and in print.

 Curator Emeritus, California Academy of Sciences, San Francisco, California
 Research Associate, Florida Museum of Natural History, Gainesville, Florida

Legacy

The following fish are named in his honor:

Eschmeyer nexus.

Rhinopias eschmeyeri a scorpionfish from the Indo-West Pacific.

The Scorpianfish Phenacoscorpius eschmeyeri Parin & Mandritsa, 1992 

The Cape Rockfish Trachyscorpia eschmeyeri Whitley, 1970.

Scorpaenopsis eschmeyeri J. E. Randall & D. W. Greenfield, 2004

The knifefish Apteronotus eschmeyeri de Santana, Maldenado-Ocampo, Severi & G. N. Mendes, 2004

See also
:Category:Taxa named by William N. Eschmeyer

References 

 Poss, S.G. & Eschmeyer, W.N. 1980. Xenaploactis, a new genus for Prosopodasys asperrimus Günther (Pisces: Aploactinidae), with descriptions of two new species. Proceedings of the California Academy of Sciences, (Series 4) 42(8), pages 287–293

External links 
 William N. Eschmeyer at calacademy.org

American ichthyologists
Living people
People associated with the California Academy of Sciences
Year of birth missing (living people)